The University of California, Berkeley, School of Information, also known as the UC Berkeley School of Information or the I School, is a graduate school and, created in 1994, the newest of the schools at the University of California, Berkeley. It was previously known as the School of Information Management and Systems (SIMS) until 2006. Its roots trace back to a program initiated in 1918 which became the School of Librarianship in 1926 and, with a broader scope, the School of Library and Information Studies in 1976. The program is located in the South Hall, near Sather Tower in the center of the campus.

Berkeley School of Information offers four degree programs: the Master of Information Management and Systems (MIMS), the Master of Information and Data Science (MIDS), the Master of Information and Cybersecurity (MICS), and an academic doctoral degree.

Curriculum

MIMS program
The Master of Information Management & Systems (MIMS) program is a 48 unit, two-year program designed to train students for careers as information professionals. Students who complete the program are awarded the Masters of Information Management and Systems (MIMS) degree. During the first year MIMS students take required courses in Information Organization and Retrieval, Distributed Computing Applications and Infrastructure, Social and Organizational Issues of Information, and Information Law and Policy. During the second year students may choose from elective courses both at the I School and in other departments. The final prerequisite for the MIMS degree is the completing of a group or individual thesis project.

MIDS program
The Master of Information and Data Science (MIDS) program is a Masters program that trains data science professionals and managers. The MIDS program is distinguished by its disciplinary breadth with course requirements including research design, ethics and privacy, data visualization, along with data engineering, machine learning, and statistical analyses.  The program is made up of 27 units with three program paths: a standard path that students complete in approximately 20 months where students are enrolled in 2 classes on average, per term; an accelerated path where students may take three courses per term and graduate in as few as 12 months; and a decelerated path where students may take one course per term and complete the degree program in no more than 32 months.

Ph.D. program
The doctoral program is a research-oriented program in which the student chooses specific fields of specialization, prepares sufficiently in the literature and the research of those fields to pass written and oral examinations, and completes original research culminating in the written dissertation. The degree of Doctor of Philosophy is conferred in recognition of a candidate's grasp of a broad field of learning and distinguished accomplishment in that field through contribution of an original piece of research revealing high critical ability and powers of imagination and synthesis.

MICS program 
The Master of Information and Cybersecurity (MICS) degree program advances a holistic approach to cybersecurity, engaging students in technical as well as human aspects of the discipline. Courses include cryptography, software security, operating system security, network security, privacy engineering, cyber risk management, applied machine learning for cybersecurity, usable privacy and security, and the economic, legal, behavioral, and ethical impacts of cybersecurity. The Master's in Cybersecurity is delivered online through weekly small class size video conferencing with faculty, and pre-recorded video lectures.

Notable faculty
This list is limited to current and past members of the faculty notable enough to have an individual page in Wikipedia.
 
 Michael Buckland
 Karen Chapple (affiliated faculty) 
 Hany Farid
 Morten Hansen 
 Marti Hearst
 Chris Hoofnagle (adjunct) 
 Peter Lyman
 Clifford Lynch (adjunct)
 Jeffrey MacKie-Mason  
 Geoffrey Nunberg (adjunct) 
 AnnaLee Saxenian 
 Steven Weber

Notable alumni
 Ashkan Soltani
 danah boyd
 Heather Ford
 Holly Liu
Jack Liangjie Xu

South Hall

The School of Information is located in the historic South Hall. Built in 1873, it is the oldest building in the University of California system. South Hall is located in the heart of campus, near the Doe Library and the Campanile (also known as Sather Tower). It is known to have the smallest bear statue on the Berkeley campus. The small bear was added by Michael H. Casey, who did the ornamental castings for the restored façade in 1997.

References

External links

University of California, Berkeley
Information schools
Educational institutions established in 1994
Education in Berkeley, California
1994 establishments in California